WGAO (88.3 FM) is a radio station broadcasting an Album Oriented Rock format. Licensed to Franklin, Massachusetts, United States.  The station is owned by Dean College.

History
On October 3, 1973, what was then known as Dean Junior College, applied for a 10-watt Class D educational radio station to broadcast on 91.3 MHz. The station was first issued the callsign WGAO on January 7, 1974, & first licensed on September 29, 1975. On September 24, 1980, it applied to upgrade to a Class A station by moving to 88.3 MHz & to increase power to 175 watts.

References

External links

GAO
Mass media in Norfolk County, Massachusetts
Radio stations established in 1975
1975 establishments in Massachusetts